APLL may refer to:
 The Academy of Persian Language and Literature
 An analog phase-locked loop
 APL Logistics - a Japan-based freight and forwarding company